WBGV (92.5 FM, "Country 92.5") is a radio station broadcasting a country music format. Licensed to Marlette, Michigan, it first began broadcasting in 1999. It serves the central area of Michigan's Thumb, and parts of the Blue Water Area. It can be heard as far away as Port Huron, Lapeer, Romeo, and Bad Axe.

WBGV offers a wide range of modern country music, along with a Sunday classics show. It is an ABC affiliate, owned by G.B. Broadcasting. WBGV is an ABC Radio Today's Best Country station.
ABC news updates are provided hourly and local news runs at noon, 5 and 6 pm. The local news is produced by sister station WMIC, in Sandusky, which also has a country music format, but only in the mornings and at night (the station is news/talk the remainder of the time it is on the air, having to sign off at local sunset). When WMIC signs off at sunset, listeners are urged to tune in to Country 92.5, because it is on the air for 24 hours.

Broadcast area
WBGV provides local coverage to the cities of Yale, Marlette, and Sandusky, as well as coverage to Croswell, Port Sanilac, and Lapeer. In the Thumb area WBGV is much stronger than competitor WSAQ.

References

Sources 
 Michiguide.com – WBGV History
 Sanilac Broadcasting – About us

External links
 

BGV
Country radio stations in the United States
Radio stations established in 1999
1999 establishments in Michigan